The men's 300 m rifle three positions was a shooting sports event held as part of the Shooting at the 1960 Summer Olympics programme. It was the eighth appearance of the event at an Olympic Games. The competition was held on 3 and 5 September 1960, with 39 shooters from 22 nations competing. Nations had been limited to two shooters each since the 1952 Games. The event was won by Hubert Hammerer in Austria's debut in the event. Hans Rudolf Spillmann of Switzerland took silver. Soviet Vasily Borisov was the second man to win two medals in the event, adding a bronze to his 1956 gold.

Background

This was the eighth appearance of the men's 300 metre three-positions rifle event, which was held 11 times between 1900 and 1972. Half of the top 10 shooters from 1956 returned: gold medalist Vasily Borisov of the Soviet Union, bronze medalist (and 1952 fifth-place finisher) Vilho Ylönen of Finland, fifth-place finisher Constantin Antonescu of Romania, seventh-place finisher Anders Kvissberg of Sweden, and ninth-place finisher Sándor Krebs of Hungary. Ylönen was also the reigning world champion.

Austria, Germany (as the United Team of Germany), Poland, and Sudan each made their debut in the event. Denmark, Finland, Sweden, and the United States each made their seventh appearance, tied for most of any nation.

Competition format

For the only time, the competition was held over two rounds. The qualifying round was a half-sized round, with each shooter firing 60 shots (20 in each position: prone, kneeling, and standing). The 39 competitors were divided into two groups, with 20 in one group and 19 in the other. The top 19 in each group qualified for the final. Thus, only one man was eliminated. 

The final round had each shooter fire 120 shots, 40 shots in each position. 

Shots were fired in series of 10. The target was 1 metre in diameter, with 10 scoring rings; targets were set at a distance of 300 metres. Thus, the maximum score possible was 1200 points. Any rifle could be used.

Records

Prior to the competition, the existing world and Olympic records were as follows.

No new world or Olympic records were set during the competition.

Schedule

All times are Australian Eastern Standard Time (UTC+10)

Results

Qualifying

The qualifying round used a 60-shot format, with a total maximum score of 600. The top 19 shooters in each group advanced.

Group 1

Bakri was the only shooter eliminated in the qualifying round, as he finished 20th in the 20-man group (and the other group had only 19 shooters, all of whom automatically advanced).

Group 2

Final

References

Shooting at the 1960 Summer Olympics
Men's 300m 3 positions